Recurvaria leucatella (lesser budmoth or white-barred groundling moth) is a moth of the family Gelechiidae. It is found in most of Europe, Turkey, Central Asia and the Caucasus.

The wingspan is 14–15 mm. The head is ochreous-white. Forewings are dark fuscous; a broad white or ochreous-white fascia at 1/3; stigmata and a dot below second discal indistinctly blackish, somewhat raised; a white spot on tornus, and another on costa opposite; some white terminal scales. Hindwings are grey. The larva is light brown to whitish-green, more or less rosy-tinged; head and plate of 2 black.

The moths are on wing from June to July depending on the location.

The larvae feed on Crataegus and Malus species.

References

External links
 Microlepidoptera.nl 
 Lepidoptera of Belgium
 UK Moths

Recurvaria
Moths described in 1759
Moths of Europe
Moths of Asia
Taxa named by Carl Alexander Clerck